European Under-18 All-Star Game 2009 was held on September 18, 2009 in Spodek Arena. Blue Team played against White Team. Both teams consisted of the best European players, which has not more than 18 years.

Rosters

Coaches
The Blue Team coaches was Damian Jennings and Sven Van Camp, the White Team coaches was Jyri Lohikoski and Željko Đokić.

See also
 EuroBasket 2009

External links
 Official European Under-18 All-Star Game 2009 website

2009–10 in European basketball